The 2016 Stockholm FIM Speedway Grand Prix was the ninth race of the 2016 Speedway Grand Prix season. It took place on 24 September at the Friends Arena in Stockholm, Sweden.

Riders 
The Speedway Grand Prix Commission nominated Jacob Thorssell as the wild card, and Peter Ljung and Linus Sundström both as Track Reserves. Second series reserve Michael Jepsen Jensen replaced the injured Nicki Pedersen, while Kim Nilsson replaced the injured Andreas Jonsson.

Results 
The Grand Prix was won by Jason Doyle, who beat Chris Holder, Fredrik Lindgren and Matej Žagar in the final. It was Doyle's third successive Grand Prix win and, as a result, he took the lead in the world championship standings. Former series leader Greg Hancock, who was eliminated in the semi-finals, was five points back in second place with defending world champion Tai Woffinden in third.

Heat details

The intermediate classification

References

See also 
 motorcycle speedway

Scandinavia
Speedway Grand Prix
Speedway Grand Prix of Scandinavia